Vis is a small Croatian island in the Adriatic Sea. It is the farthest inhabited island off the Croatian mainland. Before the end of World War I, the island was held by the Liburnians, the Republic of Venice, the Napoleonic Kingdom of Italy, and the Austrian Empire. During the 19th century, the sea to the north of Vis was the site of two naval battles. In 1920, the island was ceded to the Kingdom of Yugoslavia as part of the Treaty of Rapallo. During World War II, the island was the headquarters of the Yugoslav Partisan movement. After the war, Vis was used as a naval base for the Yugoslav People's Army until 1989. The island's main industries are viticulture, fishing, fish processing, and tourism.

Geography

The farthest inhabited island off the Croatian mainland, Vis had a population of 3,617 in 2011. The island's two largest settlements are the town of Vis on the island's eastern side (the settlement for which the island was originally named) and Komiža on its western coast.

History

Ancient history

Vis was inhabited by the time of the Neolithic period. In the 4th century BC, the Greek tyrant of Syracuse, Dionysius the Elder, founded the colony Issa on the island. A town on an island of the same name was settled by Illyrians, who were under the domination of Liburni from the 8th to the 6th centuries B.C. At the beginning of the 4th century B.C. the island was colonized by Syracusan Greeks as part of a plan of Dionysios the Elder to control the Adriatic. During the 3rd century Issa founded the emporia Tragurion (Traù, now Trogir) and Epetion (Stobreč) on the Illynan mainland. Its predominance in the region lasted until the first Illyro-Roman war 229-219 B.C. when it became a pawn in the battles of greater powers. In the civil war it sided with Pompey and consequently lost its privileges and autonomy in 47 B.C. when it was reduced to the rank of an oppidum civium Romanorum and was dependent on the newly founded colony at Salona. As a polis, Issa minted its own money, and these coins of many types had wide circulation. The town, situated on a slope on the W side of a large bay, was defended by strong Hellenistic walls, still visible in an irregular quadrangle (265 x 360 m) that enclosed an area of 9.8 ha. The street grid and foundations of houses have been found. The necropolis has yielded many pieces of pottery, including some from South Italy. The wall of the cavea of the theater, built in the Roman period, is incorporated into the present Franciscan Monastery. It could seat about 3000 persons. Inscriptions, statues, coins, and pottery are preserved in the archaeological museums at Split and Zagreb. Later, it became an independent polis, and even minted its own money and founded its own colonies, the most notable of which was Aspálathos (the modern-day city of Split).

In the 1st century BC, the island was held by the Liburnians. Its importance in the region ended with the first Illyro-Roman war (229–219 BC). Having sided with Pompeus during the period of civil struggles in Rome, became an "oppidum civium Romanorum" in 47 BC.

Under Venice
Until 1797, the island was under the rule of the Republic of Venice. During this time large settlements developed along the coastline (Comisa (now Komiža) and Lissa (now Vis)). Administratively, the island of Lissa was for centuries bound to the island of Lesina, now named Hvar. The Venetian influence is still recognizable in architecture found on the island, and some vocabulary of the Croatian dialect spoken locally is Venetian in origin.

19th century
After the short-lived Napoleonic Kingdom of Italy, with Italian as the official language, the island was ruled by the Austrian Empire from 1814. It maintained its Italian name of Lissa. After the end of World War I, it was under Italian rule again in the period from 1918 to 1921, according to the provisions of the 1915 Treaty of London, before it was ceded to Kingdom of Yugoslavia as part of the 1920 Treaty of Rapallo.

The sea to the north of the island was the location of two battles:
on 13 March 1811, a small Royal Navy squadron under the command of Captain William Hoste, defeated a larger French squadron in the Battle of Lissa (1811)

Second World War

Vis was at one point the site of the general headquarters of Marshal Josip Broz Tito, the leader of the Yugoslav Partisan resistance movement. It was occupied by Italy between 1941 and 1943, then was liberated by the Partisans and held by a British flotilla in 1943–44. At the end of World War II the island returned to Yugoslavia. During the war the island was mined. Allied fighter planes were based at a small airfield that was also used for emergency landings of Allied bombers, including an American B-24 flown by George McGovern. No. 6 Squadron RAF extensively used the airfield as a forward operating base, flying Hawker Hurricane Mk IV fighter aircraft, from May 1944 to February 1945.

During World War II, a crate of the Armed Services Editions of paperback books was dropped by parachute along with other supplies on to Vis Island off the coast of Yugoslavia. The books were then read aloud to the partisans by English speaking soldiers who translated the books as they read them.

Early in July 1944, the novelist Evelyn Waugh flew with Randolph Churchill from Bari, Italy, to Vis as part of the British military mission to Yugoslavia. There they met Marshal Tito. Waugh and Churchill returned to Bari before flying back to Yugoslavia to begin their mission, but their aeroplane crash-landed, both men were injured, and their mission was delayed for a month.

During WWII the island was also home to 1435 Squadron of the RAF flying Mark IX Spitfires in ground support of allied troops fighting in Italy.

After 1945
After the war, the Yugoslav People's Army used the island as one of its main naval bases until abandoning the base in 1989. After Croatia became independent in 1991, its navy did not reclaim most of the facilities, and the many abandoned buildings are being used for civilian purposes and tourism, including tunnels, bunkers and a secret submarine base. In 2008, 34 mines left over from World War II were cleared from the island.

In 2017 the movie Mamma Mia! Here We Go Again was filmed on location on Vis.

In 2019 GEOPARK Vis archipelago became a member of UNESCO Global Geoparks.

Administration
Vis town and Komiža are seats of separate administrative municipalities which cover the entire island and nearby islets, which are both part of Split-Dalmatia County.

Economy
The island's main industries are agriculture (mainly viticulture), fishing, fish processing, and tourism.

Around 20% of the island's arable land is covered with vineyards. Autochthonous vine species cultivated on the island are Plavac Mali, Kurteloška, and Vugava.

The sea around Vis is rich with fish, especially blue fish (sardine, mackerel and anchovy).  Komiža fishermen of the 16th century developed their own type of fishing boat, the falkuša, which was used until the second half of the 20th century because of its excellent features.

Access 
Vis is accessed only by ferry boat. Jadrolinija services the island using mainly the car ferry Petar Hektorović. There is also high speed passenger catamaran service provided by Jadrolinija.

Gallery

References

 Jefford, C.G. RAF Squadrons, a Comprehensive Record of the Movement and Equipment of all RAF Squadrons and their Antecedents since 1912. Shrewsbury: Airlife Publishing, 2001. .
 The "Tin-opener". No 6 Squadron (RAF ) Association Newsletter. July 2014.

Books

External links

 Komiza - Island Vis Tourist Association
 Vis - Croatian National Tourist Board
 Vis Tourist Association

 
Islands of Croatia
Islands of the Adriatic Sea
Greek colonies in Illyria
Landforms of Split-Dalmatia County